Khandelwal may refer to:
 Khandelwal communities
Khandelwal Vaishya, a Vaishnav Vaish trading community originally from Khandela.
 Khandelwal Jain or Sarawagi, a major Jain community originally from Khandela, a historical town in northern Rajasthan